The South Africa cricket team toured Pakistan for two Test matches and five One Day Internationals in October 2007.

Squads

 Mohammad Hafeez was replaced by Khalid Latif after the first two ODIs, Shoaib Akhtar was added to the squad for the final ODI.

Tour matches

First-class: Pakistan Cricket Board Patron's XI v South Africans

50-over: Pakistan Cricket Board XI v South Africans

Test series

1st Test

2nd Test

ODI series

1st ODI

2nd ODI

3rd ODI

4th ODI

5th ODI

References

External links
 Cricinfo: South Africa in Pakistan

2007 in Pakistani cricket
2007 in South African cricket
International cricket competitions in 2007–08
Pakistani cricket seasons from 2000–01
2007–08